The 2012 Currie Cup Premier Division was the 74th season in the competition since it started in 1889 and was contested from 11 August to 27 October 2012. The tournament (known as the Absa Currie Cup Premier Division for sponsorship reasons) is the top tier of South Africa's premier domestic rugby union competition.

Competition

Regular season and title play offs
There were 6 participating teams in the 2012 Currie Cup Premier Division. These teams played each other twice over the course of the season, once at home and once away.

Teams received four points for a win and two points for a draw. Bonus points were awarded to teams that scored 4 or more tries in a game, as well as to teams losing a match by 7 points or less. Teams were to be ranked by points, then points difference (points scored less points conceded).

The top 4 teams qualified for the title play-offs. In the semi-finals, the team that finish first will have home advantage against the team that finished fourth, while the team that finished second will have home advantage against the team that finished third. The winners of these semi-finals will play each other in the final, at the home venue of the higher-placed team.

Relegation play offs
The bottom team on the log will also qualify for the promotion/relegation play-offs. That team will play off against the team placed first in the 2012 Currie Cup First Division over two legs. The winner over these two ties (determined via team tables, with all Currie Cup ranking regulations in effect) will qualify for the 2013 Currie Cup Premier Division, while the losing team will qualify for the 2013 Currie Cup First Division.

Teams

Changes from 2011

Team Listing

Table

Fixtures and results
All times are South African (GMT+2).

Round one

Round two

Round three

Round four

Round Five

Round Six

Round Seven

Round Eight

Round Nine

Round Ten

Title Play-Off Games

Semi-finals

Final

Players

Player Statistics

Leading try scorers

<small>Source: South African Rugby Union

Leading point scorers

Source: South African Rugby Union Correct as at 6 October 2012

Awards

See also
 2012 Currie Cup First Division
 2012 Vodacom Cup
 2012 Under-21 Provincial Championship
 2012 Under-19 Provincial Championship

References

External links
 
 

 
2012
2012 in South African rugby union
2012 rugby union tournaments for clubs